Mynach Falls (Welsh: Rhaeadr Mynach) is a waterfall near Aberystwyth in the county of Ceredigion, Wales.

It occurs where the River Mynach drops  in 5 steps down a steep and narrow ravine before it meets the River Rheidol.

The area is famous for the Devil's Bridge (Welsh: Pontarfynach - Bridge Over the Mynach River), a series of three arch bridges that span the river, one above the other. The area near the waterfall is the terminus of the Vale of Rheidol Railway.

References

External links 
Photos of the Mynach Falls on geograph.org.uk

Waterfalls of Ceredigion